Subjective may refer to:

 Subjectivity, a subject's personal perspective, feelings, beliefs, desires or discovery, as opposed to those made from an independent, objective, point of view
 Subjective experience, the subjective quality of conscious experience
 Subjectivism, a philosophical tenet that accords primacy to subjective experience as fundamental of all measure and law
 Subjective case, grammatical case for a noun
 Subject (philosophy), who has subjective experiences or a relationship with another entity
 Subjective theory of value, an economic theory of value
 A school of bayesian probability stating that the state of knowledge corresponds to personal belief
 Subjectivity (journal), an academic journal

See also 
 Subjectivist fallacy
 Subjunctive
 Objective (disambiguation)